The 2020 New York Guardians season was the only season for the New York Guardians as a professional American football franchise. They played as charter members of the XFL, one of eight teams to compete in the league for the 2020 season. The Guardians played their home games at MetLife Stadium and were led by head coach Kevin Gilbride.

Their inaugural season was cut short due to the COVID-19 pandemic and the XFL officially suspended operations for the remainder of the season on March 20, 2020.

Standings

Schedule
All times Eastern

Final roster

Staff

Season summary 
The Guardians destroyed the Tampa Bay Vipers in the first game of the season, winning 23–3. The next week, however, they were shut out by the DC Defenders 27–0. They stumbled again in week 3, losing to the St. Louis BattleHawks 29–9. They stole a win from the Los Angeles Wildcats at home by 3 points, winning 17–14 with a change at the quarterback position, starting Luis Perez over Matt McGloin.  This success continued into week 5, where the Guardians were able to defeat the Dallas Renegades on the road 30-12 before the season's abrupt end.

Game summaries

Week 1: Tampa Bay Vipers

The Guardians started their inaugural season at home for Round 1 against the Vipers.  Heading into halftime, the Guardians led 17–0.  Though, the Vipers were able to get on the board in the third quarter, in the fourth quarter, the Guardians wrapped up the scoring of the game with a late touchdown (with a failed 1-point attempt) to make it 23–3.  This would be the final score of the game.

With the win, the Guardians started their season 1–0.

Week 2: at DC Defenders

In their first road game ever, the Guardians were shut out in Round 1 against the Defenders 27–0.

With the loss, the Guardians fell to 1–1.

Week 3: at St. Louis Battlehawks

After being shut out on the road, the Guardians traveled again this time for Round 1 against the Battlehawks.  The Battlehawks scored the only points of the first quarter when Christine Michael ran for a 14-yard touchdown (with a failed point attempt) to make it 6–0.  The Guardians got on the board in the second quarter when Matt McCrane kicked a 53-yard field goal to make it 6–3.  The Battlehawks would go on a 17–0 run to take a 23–3 lead at halftime.  They added to their run by scoring the only points of the third quarter when Taylor Russolino kicked a 58-yard field goal for a 26–3 lead.  The Guardians scored again in the fourth quarter when Luis Perez found Austin Duke on an 8-yard touchdown pass (with a failed point attempt) to make it 26–9.  Russolino closed out the scoring of the game with a 36-yard field goal as the Battlehawks won 29–9.

With the loss, the Guardians fell to 1–2.

Week 4: Los Angeles Wildcats

After another tough road loss, the Guardians went home to take on the Wildcats.  The Guardians scored first in the first quarter when Matt McCrane kicked a 51-yard field goal to make it 3–0.  Though, the Wildcats would take the lead when Josh Johnson found Tre McBride on a 4-yard pass (with a failed 2-point play) to make it 6–3.  In the second quarter, it was all Guardians when they made it 14–6 at halftime.  After the break, the Wildcats tied the game up at 14-14 when Josh Johnson found Saeed Blacknall on a 42-yard pass.  However, in the fourth, quarter the Guardians would wrap the scoring up when McCrane kicked a 47-yard field goal to make the final score 17–14.

With the win, the Guardians improved to 2-2.

Week 5: at Dallas Renegades

After a tough home win, the Guardians traveled to take on the Renegades.  In the first quarter, the Renegades scored first when Austin MacGinnis kicked a 23-yard field goal to make it 3–0.  The Guardians tied it up later on in the quarter when Matt McCrane kicked a 46-yard field goal to make it 3-3.  In the second quarter, McCrane kicked a 39-yard field goal to make it 6–3.  However, the Renegades tied it up before halftime when MacGinnis kicked a 36-yard field goal to make it 6-6.  In the third quarter, the Guardians retook the lead when Marvin Williams ran for a 1-yard touchdown (with a failed point play) to make it 12–6.  They would make it 20-6 when Luis Perez found Carl Pearson on an 80-yard touchdown pass.  Philip Nelson was then intercepted by Ryan Mueller and it was returned 33 yards for a touchdown to make it 27–6.  The Renegades then made it 27-12 after Austin Walter ran a kickoff 97 yards for a touchdown (with a failed point play) to close out the quarter.  In a highly defensive fourth quarter, the Guardians scored the only points in what would be MacGinnis's fourth field goal from 26 yards out to make the final score 30–12.

With the win, the Guardians improved to 3–2.

After a huge win on the road, the Guardians were to return home for a game against the Roughnecks.  However, this game, along with the remainder of their games were canceled due to the sudden rise of the COVID-19 pandemic.

Nevertheless, the Guardians managed to finish their first season with a winning record.

References

New York
2020 in sports in New Jersey
New York Guardians